Karthavyam is a 1982 Indian Malayalam film, directed by Joshiy and produced by Jagan Appachan. The film stars Madhu, Jagathy Sreekumar, Sankaradi and M. G. Soman in the lead roles. The film has musical score by Sathyam. The film was an adaptation of K. Balachander's play Major Chandrakanth.

Cast
Madhu as Major Ramkumar
Jagathy Sreekumar as Mohanan
Sankaradi as Menon
M. G. Soman as Srikumar
Master Suresh
Merly
Ravikumar as Krishna Kumar
Sripriya as Geetha

Soundtrack
The music was composed by Sathyam and the lyrics were written by R. K. Damodaran.

References

External links
 

1982 films
Films directed by Joshiy
1980s Malayalam-language films